Sparta Cricket Club Ground, also known as the Sparta Recreational Club, is a cricket ground in Walvis Bay, Namibia. The first recorded match on the ground was in the 1993/94 cricket season. It hosted its first first-class cricket match on 15 October 2015. It was used as a venue to host matches during the 2016–17 Sunfoil 3-Day Cup.

References

External links
Sparta Cricket Club Ground, Walvis Bay at CricketArchive

Cricket grounds in Namibia
Buildings and structures in Erongo Region
1993 establishments in Namibia